This is a recap of the 1997 season for the Professional Bowlers Association (PBA) Tour.  It was the tour's 39th season, and consisted of 28 events.

John Gant won the season-opening Brunswick World Tournament of Champions for his first major title, while Rick Steelsmith was victorious at the PBA National Championship.

Walter Ray Williams, Jr. won three titles on the season, and was honored with his second consecutive PBA Player of the Year award and fourth overall.

At the Ebonite Challenge in Rochester, New York, Steve Hoskins rolled the PBA's 11th televised 300 game, and also went on to win the tournament.

1997 also marked the end of ABC-TV's affiliation with the PBA Tour, as its Professional Bowlers Tour series came to a close after 36 years.

Tournament schedule

References

External links
1997 Season Schedule

Professional Bowlers Association seasons
1997 in bowling